Qutab Minar is an elevated station on the Yellow Line of the Delhi Metro. It was inaugurated on 21 June 2010 as part of the 14.47 km completely elevated corridor from Qutab Minar – HUDA City Centre. The station is close to the Qutb Minar and its monuments, a UNESCO World Heritage Site. Parking facilities are available. During peak hours, it serves as an alternate southern terminus for the yellow line along with

Station layout

Facilities
ATMs are available at Qutab Minar metro station.

See also
List of Delhi Metro stations
Transport in Delhi
Delhi Metro Rail Corporation
Delhi Suburban Railway
Qutb Minar
Qutb Minar complex
Qutb

References

External links
 Delhi Metro Rail Corporation Ltd. (Official site) 
 Delhi Metro Annual Reports
 
 UrbanRail.Net – descriptions of all metro systems in the world, each with a schematic map showing all stations.

Railway stations opened in 2010
Delhi Metro stations
Railway stations in South Delhi district
2010 establishments in Delhi